Portrait of an Artist, as an Old Man is a novel by Joseph Heller, published posthumously in 2000.  His final work, it depicts an elderly author as he tries to write a novel that is as successful as his earlier work, mirroring Heller's own career after the success of Catch-22.

Plot
The story is of Eugene Pota, a prominent writer who, in his old age, is struggling for that last piece of fiction that could be his magnum opus, or at least on par with his earlier writings. Littered throughout the novel are many of Pota's ideas and drafts of possible stories, such as the sexual biography of his wife, or of Hera's trouble with Zeus.

Title
The title is evocatively similar to James Joyce's A Portrait of the Artist as a Young Man. The main character's name "Pota" is possibly the abbreviation of the phrase "Portrait Of The Artist".

Reception
Critical reception to the novel was mixed. Michiko Kakutani, chief book critic for The New York Times, judged that "skills Heller did possess in abundance at the height of his career are also sorely lacking in this novel", and called it "a sad coda to a distinguished career." Tim Adams, writing for The Guardian, was more positive, calling it a "moderate success" and describing it as a "caustic self-parody".

Famous quotation
"My lord came home from the wars today and pleasured me twice with his boots on" -- Sarah Churchill, Duchess of Marlborough. This quote influenced the main character (Eugene Pota) to write about his sex book or "The Sexual Biography of My Wife."

Notes

2000 American novels
Novels by Joseph Heller
Novels published posthumously
Novels about writers